Mama Don't Cry or Mama Don't Grieve is a 1998 gangster film.

The stars of the film include famous Russian actors such as Gosha Kutsenko, Andrey Panin, Yevgeni Sidikhin, Nikolai Chindyajkin, Valeriy Priyomykhov, and Ivan Bortnik. Directed by Maksim Pezhemsky.

Synopsis
A sailor attending a wedding assaults a stranger who begins taking liberties with the bride. Unfortunately for the sailor, the stranger is the head of the local mafia. When a contract is placed on his head the sailor finds that many people are now very interested in him.

References

External links

 Trailer and Screenshots

1997 films
1990s Russian-language films
Russian crime comedy films
Films directed by Maksim Pezhemsky
1990s crime comedy films